Dear Mr. President is a 1942 album by the Almanac Singers.

History

After the Japanese attacks on Pearl Harbor, in  February 1942 the Almanacs went into the studio to record a set of songs supporting the American war effort.  This was partly because with American entrance into World War II all American unions adopted a no-strike pledge. Another contributing factor was that, after Hitler invaded the USSR in June 1941, Moscow had reversed its previous anti-intervention stance as expressed in the group's earlier album, Songs for John Doe. This lost the Almanacs a sizeable chunk of their working repertoire.

Track listing

Personnel
 Agnes Cunningham, vocals, accordion
 Baldwin "Butch" Hawes, vocals
 Bess Lomax Hawes, vocals, mandolin
 Arthur Stern, vocals
 Pete Seeger, vocals, banjo

Production notes:
 Earl Robinson – director

References 

Almanac Singers albums
1942 albums
Keynote Records albums
Albums produced by Alan Lomax